Lobelia fissiflora is a small herbaceous plant in the family Campanulaceae native to Western Australia, and first described in 2010 by Neville Walsh, David Albrecht and Eric Knox

The herb is found scattered through the eastern Wheatbelt, southern parts of the MidWest and Goldfields-Esperance regions of Western Australia.

References

fissiflora
Flora of Western Australia
Plants described in 2010
Taxa named by Neville Grant Walsh